D'Wäschfra is a satire newspaper published in Luxembourg.

External links
 D'Wäschfra official website

Luxembourgish-language newspapers
Newspapers published in Luxembourg
2010 establishments in Luxembourg
Publications established in 2010
Satirical newspapers